Synaptic vesicle glycoprotein 2A is a ubiquitous synaptic vesicle protein that in humans is encoded by the SV2A gene. The protein is targeted by the anti-epileptic drugs (anticonvulsants) levetiracetam and brivaracetam.

See also
 SV2B

References

Further reading

External links